Yunmen Temple is a Buddhist temple located in Xiangxiang, Hunan, China.

History
The original temple dates back to the 1050, in the reign of Emperor Renzong of the Song dynasty. At that time it initially called "Stone Stele Temple". It was renamed Yunmen Temple during the Yongle era (1403–1424) of the early Ming dynasty (1368–1644). The present version still maintain the style of the Qing dynasty.

In 1959, the temple has been authorized as the provincial key cultural unit by the Hunan Provincial Government.

In 2005, it was classified as a provincial key Buddhist temple by the Hunan Provincial Government.

Architecture
Now the existing main buildings include Frontal Hall, Middle Hall, Mahavira Hall and Guanyin Hall.

Hall of Guanyin
A  wood carving statue of Thousand Armed and Eyed Guanyin is preserved in the center of the hall, which is the largest wood carving statue of Guanyin in Jiangnan.

The statues of Eighteen Arhats are placed in the corridor of the temple. They were carved in 1893 with stone.

Xiangxiang Museum
The Xiangxiang Museum is located in the temple. It was constructed in 1959 by Xiangxiang Municipal Government. A total of 7,000 cultural relics houses in the museum.

References

External links
 

Buddhist temples in Hunan
Buildings and structures in Xiangxiang
Tourist attractions in Xiangxiang
19th-century establishments in China
19th-century Buddhist temples